Lee Kiefer (born June 15, 1994) is an American right-handed foil fencer.

Kiefer is a four-time NCAA champion, ten-time team Pan American champion, nine-time individual Pan American champion, and 2018 team world champion.

A three-time Olympian, Kiefer is a 2021 individual Olympic champion. Kiefer is the first American foil fencer in history to win an individual Olympic gold medal.

Kiefer competed in the 2012 London Olympic Games, the 2016 Rio de Janeiro Olympic Games, and the 2020 Tokyo Olympic Games.

Career

Kiefer was born in Cleveland, Ohio and grew up in Lexington, Kentucky. Her mother Teresa, a psychiatrist, was born in the Philippines and immigrated to the US as a child, and her father Steve, a neurosurgeon, once captained the Duke University fencing team. She graduated from Paul Laurence Dunbar High School in 2012. She attended the University of Notre Dame, where she fenced for the Fighting Irish and graduated in 2017. She is now a medical student at the University of Kentucky College of Medicine.

Her sister is former Harvard foil fencer and 2011 NCAA champion Alex Kiefer, who is now a doctor. Kiefer also has a younger brother, Axel, who was the 2015 USA Fencing National Championships Junior Gold Medalist, and who also attended and fenced foil for the University of Notre Dame, coming in second in the 2019 NCAA Championship. 

Kiefer earned a bronze medal in Women's foil at the 2011 World Fencing Championships. She placed 5th at the 2012 London Olympic Games, after losing to eventual silver medalist Arianna Errigo in the quarter final, 15–10. In the 2014–15 season she climbed her first World Cup podium with a silver medal in Saint-Maur. She went on to win the Algiers World Cup in early 2015 after defeating world No.1 Arianna Errigo, who had prevailed over her in Saint-Maur. By winning at the 2014 NCAA Fencing National Championships, she joined male fencer Gerek Meinhardt and swimmer Emma Reaney as part of the 2nd Notre Dame Fighting Irish trio to be named individual national champion in a single year and the 4th to be either individual national champion or national athlete of the year in a single year.

Following her win at the Long Beach Grand Prix on March 18, 2017, she moved into #1 in FIE world rankings, becoming the first American woman to hold the #1 position.

She qualified to represent the United States in fencing at the 2020 Olympics in Tokyo in 2021 and reached the final in the individual foil. In the final, she defeated Inna Deriglazova, the defending champion, with a score of 15–13 to win gold. She is the first American, male or female, to win the gold medal in Olympic individual foil.

Personal life
Lee and fellow foil fencer Gerek Meinhardt began dating in January 2012. They were engaged in January of 2018 and married in September 2019.

Medal record

Olympic Games

World Championship

Pan American Championship

Grand Prix

World Cup

NCAA Championship

See also
List of USFA Division I National Champions
University of Kentucky
University of Notre Dame
Fédération Internationale d'Escrime
2020 Summer Olympics

References

External links

Profile at the United States Fencing Federation

1994 births
Living people
American female foil fencers
American sportspeople of Filipino descent
Fencers at the 2020 Summer Olympics
Fencers at the 2011 Pan American Games
Fencers at the 2012 Summer Olympics
Medalists at the 2011 Pan American Games
Medalists at the 2020 Summer Olympics
Notre Dame Fighting Irish fencers
Olympic gold medalists for the United States in fencing
Pan American Games medalists in fencing
Pan American Games gold medalists for the United States
Pan American Games silver medalists for the United States
Paul Laurence Dunbar High School (Lexington, Kentucky) alumni
Sportspeople from Cleveland
Sportspeople from Lexington, Kentucky
University of Kentucky College of Medicine alumni
20th-century American women
21st-century American women
World Fencing Championships medalists